Horatio Seymour (May 31, 1810February 12, 1886) was an American politician. He served as Governor of New York from 1853 to 1854 and from 1863 to 1864. He was the Democratic Party nominee for president in the 1868 United States presidential election, losing to Republican Ulysses S. Grant.

Born in Pompey, New York, Seymour was admitted to the New York bar in 1832. He primarily focused on managing his family's business interests. After serving as a military secretary to Governor William L. Marcy, Seymour won election to the New York State Assembly. He was elected that body's speaker in 1845 and aligned with Marcy's "Softshell Hunker" faction. Seymour was nominated for governor in 1850 but narrowly lost to the Whig candidate, Washington Hunt. He defeated Hunt in the 1852 gubernatorial election, and spent much of his tenure trying to reunify the fractured Democratic Party, losing his 1854 re-election campaign in part due to this disunity.

Despite this defeat, Seymour emerged as a prominent national figure within the party. As several Southern states threatened secession, Seymour supported the Crittenden Compromise as a way to avoid civil war. He supported the Union war effort during the Civil War but criticized President Abraham Lincoln's leadership. He won election to another term as governor in 1862 and continued to oppose many of Lincoln's policies. Several delegates at the 1864 Democratic National Convention hoped to nominate Seymour for president, but Seymour declined to seek the nomination. Beset by various issues, he narrowly lost re-election in 1864. After the war, Seymour supported President Andrew Johnson's Reconstruction policies.

As the 1868 Democratic National Convention opened, there was no clear front-runner for the Democratic presidential nomination, but Seymour remained widely popular. Serving as the chairman of the convention, as he had in 1864, Seymour refused to seek the nomination for himself. After twenty-two indecisive ballots, the convention nominated Seymour, who finally relented on his opposition to running for president. Seymour faced General Ulysses S. Grant, the widely popular Republican Party nominee, in the 1868 election. Grant won a strong majority of the electoral vote, though his margin in the popular vote was not as overwhelming. Seymour never again sought public office but remained active in politics and supported Grover Cleveland's 1884 campaign for president.

Early life and education
Seymour was born in Pompey Hill, Onondaga County, New York. His father was Henry Seymour, a merchant and politician; his mother, Mary Ledyard Forman (1785–1859), of Matawan, New Jersey, was the daughter of General Jonathan Forman and Mary Ledyard.  He was one of six children, and his sister Julia Catherine became the wife of Roscoe Conkling. At the age of 10 he moved with the rest of his family to Utica, where he attended a number of local schools, including Geneva College (later Hobart College). In the autumn of 1824 he was sent to the American Literary, Scientific & Military Academy (Norwich University). Upon his return to Utica after graduating in 1828,  Seymour read for the law in the offices of Greene Bronson and Samuel Beardsley. Though admitted to the bar in 1832, he did not enjoy work as an attorney and was primarily preoccupied with politics and managing his family's business interests. He married Mary Bleecker in 1835.

Political career

Entry into politics
Seymour's first role in politics came in 1833, when he was named military secretary to the state's newly elected Democratic governor, William L. Marcy with the rank of colonel. The six years in that position gave Seymour an invaluable education in the politics of the state, and established a firm friendship between the two men. In 1839 he returned to Utica to take over the management of his family's estate in the aftermath of his father's suicide two years earlier, investing profitably in real estate, banks, mines, railroads, and other ventures. In 1841 he won election to the New York State Assembly, and he served simultaneously as mayor of Utica from 1842 to 1843. He won election to the Assembly again in 1843 to 1844, and thanks in part to massive turnover in the ranks of the Democratic caucus he was elected speaker in 1845.

When, in the late 1840s, the New York Democratic Party split between the two factions of Hunkers and Barnburners, Seymour was among those identified with the more conservative Hunker faction, led by Marcy and Senator Daniel S. Dickinson. After this split led to disaster in the election of 1848, when the division between the Hunkers, who supported Lewis Cass, and the Barnburners, who supported their leader, former President Martin Van Buren, Seymour became identified with Marcy's faction within the Hunkers, the so-called "Softshell Hunkers," who hoped to reunite with the Barnburners so as to be able to bring back Democratic dominance within the state.

First term as governor
In 1850, Seymour was the gubernatorial candidate of the reunited Democratic Party, but he narrowly lost to the Whig candidate, Washington Hunt. Seymour and the Softs supported the candidacy of their leader, Marcy, for the presidency in 1852, but when he was defeated they enthusiastically campaigned for Franklin Pierce in 1852. That year proved a good one for the Softs, as Seymour, again supported by a unified Democratic Party, narrowly defeated Hunt in a gubernatorial rematch, while Pierce, overwhelmingly elected president, appointed Marcy as his Secretary of State.

Seymour's first term as governor of New York proved turbulent. He won approval of a measure to finance the enlargement of the Erie Canal via a $10.5 million loan in a special election in February 1854. But much of his tenure was plagued by factional chaos within the state Democratic Party. The Pierce administration's use of the patronage power alienated the Hards, who determined to run their own gubernatorial candidate against Seymour in 1854. Furthermore, the administration's support of the unpopular Kansas–Nebraska Act, with which Seymour was associated indirectly through his friendship with Marcy, cost him many votes. Whigs controlling the state legislature also sought to injure him further politically by responding to his call for action on the problem of alcohol abuse with a bill establishing a statewide prohibition, which Seymour vetoed as unconstitutional. Yet for all his troubles Seymour's prospects for reelection looked promising, as the divisions of the Democrats' opponents between the regular Whig candidate, Myron H. Clark, and the Know-Nothing Daniel Ullman appeared to be more dangerous to the Democrats' opponents than the candidacy of the Hard Greene C. Bronson looked to Democratic unity. In the end, however, the anti-Democratic tide was too strong, and in the four-way race Clark, who received only one-third of the vote, defeated Seymour by 309 votes.

Interlude

Despite his defeat, as a former governor of the largest state of the Union, Seymour emerged as a prominent figure in party politics at the national level. In 1856, he was considered a possible compromise presidential candidate in the event of a deadlock between Franklin Pierce and James Buchanan until he wrote a letter definitively ruling himself out. In 1860, some considered Seymour a compromise candidate for the Democratic nomination at the reconvening convention in Baltimore. Seymour wrote a letter to the editor of his local newspaper declaring unreservedly that he was not candidate for either president or vice president. Seymour supported the candidacy of Stephen A. Douglas for the presidency in both 1856 and 1860. In 1861, he accepted nomination as the Democratic candidate for the United States Senate, which was largely an empty honor as the Republican majorities in the state legislature rendered a Republican victory a foregone conclusion.

In the secession crisis following Abraham Lincoln's election in 1860, Seymour strongly endorsed the proposed Crittenden Compromise. After the start of the Civil War, Seymour took a cautious middle position within his party, supporting the war effort but criticizing Lincoln's conduct of the war. Seymour was especially critical of Lincoln's wartime centralization of power and restrictions on civil liberties, as well as his support for emancipation.

Second term as governor

In 1862, the sitting governor, Republican Edwin D. Morgan, announced that he would not run for an additional term. Recognizing the symbolic importance of a victory in the Empire State, the Democratic Party nominated Seymour as the strongest candidate available. Though Seymour accepted the nomination with reluctance, he threw himself into the election, campaigning across the state in the hope that a Democratic victory would restrain the actions of the Radical Republicans in Washington. He won a close race against the Republican candidate James S. Wadsworth, one of a series of victories by the Democratic ticket in the state that year.

Seymour's second term proved to be even more tumultuous than his first one. As governor of the largest state in the Union from 1863 to 1864, Seymour was one of the most prominent Democratic opponents of the President. He opposed the Lincoln administration's institution of the military draft in 1863 on constitutional grounds, an act which led many to question his support for the war. He also opposed a bill giving votes to the soldiers on legal grounds, vetoing the bill when it reached his desk. While not opposed to the goal he preferred to establish voting provisions through a constitutional amendment that was working its way simultaneously through the state legislature; nonetheless, his veto was portrayed by opponents as hostility to the soldiers. His decision to pay the state's foreign creditors using gold rather than greenbacks alienated "easy money" supporters, while his veto of a bill granting traction rights on Broadway in Manhattan earned him the opposition of Tammany Hall. Finally, his efforts to conciliate the rioters during the New York Draft Riots of July 1863 was used against him by the Republicans, who accused him of treason and support for the Confederacy.

The growing accumulation of problems steadily eroded Seymour's position as governor. In what was regarded as a rebuke of his policies, Republicans swept the 1863 state midterm elections, winning all of the major offices and taking control of the State Assembly. In the state elections the following year, Seymour himself was defeated for reelection in a close race by Republican Reuben Fenton.

Prominent Democrat

Seymour continued as a prominent figure in national Democratic politics both during and immediately after his second term as governor. In 1864, he served as permanent chairman at the Democratic National Convention, where the opposition of many delegates to the two frontrunners, General George B. McClellan, a War Democrat, and Thomas H. Seymour (no relation to Horatio), a Copperhead, led many to seek out Seymour as a compromise candidate. He refused to be nominated, however, with the nomination ultimately going to McClellan. In the aftermath of the war Seymour joined other Democrats in supporting President Andrew Johnson's Reconstruction policies, and was a strong opponent of Radical Reconstruction, with its emphasis on guaranteeing civil and political rights for freed slaves.

1868 Presidential election

Nomination
As the 1868 presidential election approached, there was no clear candidate for the Democratic nomination. Of the numerous candidates in contention, George H. Pendleton, who had run as the Democratic vice-presidential nominee in 1864, enjoyed considerable support but alienated the fiscal conservatives in the party with his plan to pay off federal debt using greenbacks. When Seymour was approached about running for the nomination, he demurred again, preferring that either Indiana Senator Thomas A. Hendricks or U.S. Chief Justice Salmon P. Chase receive the nomination instead.

At the convention, Seymour once again served as permanent chairman. Balloting began on June 7; on the fourth ballot, the chairman of the North Carolina delegation cast his state's votes for Seymour, whereupon the former governor again restated his refusal to accept the nomination. Two days later, as the twenty-second ballot was being taken, it appeared that Hendricks was in the process of winning the nomination until the leader of the Ohio delegation suddenly switched his delegation's votes to Seymour. Though Seymour reiterated his unwillingness to be the nominee, the delegations revised their votes and gave the nomination to him unanimously.

Campaign

With the nomination forced upon him, Seymour committed himself to the campaign. He faced considerable challenges; his opponent, General Ulysses S. Grant, enjoyed the support of a unified Republican party and most of the nation's press. While he generally adhered to the tradition that presidential nominees did not actively campaign, Seymour did undertake a tour of the Midwest and the mid-Atlantic states in mid-October. In his campaign Seymour advocated a policy of conservative, limited government, and he opposed the Reconstruction policies of the Republicans in Congress. Seymour's campaign was also marked by pronounced appeals to racism with repeated attempts to brand General Grant as the "Nigger" candidate and Seymour as the "White Man's" candidate. The Republican campaign, by contrast, was the first in which they "waved the bloody shirt", highlighting Seymour's support for mob violence against African-Americans. Though Seymour ran fairly close to Grant in the popular vote, he was defeated decisively in the electoral vote by a count of 214 to 80. Subsequent to Seymour's loss, the Fifteenth Amendment to the federal Constitution was adopted which not only guaranteed the federal right to vote for recently emancipated slaves and others of African ancestry but also compelled New York State to reinstate voting rights for such citizens.

Later years
After the presidential election, Seymour remained involved in state politics, though primarily as an elder statesman rather than an active politician. He received a number of honors during this period, including the chancellorship of Union College in 1873. In 1874 he turned down almost certain election to the United States Senate, urging the nomination instead of the eventual choice, Francis Kernan. He refused two additional efforts to nominate him for the New York governorship, in 1876 and 1879, as well as a final attempt to select him as the Democratic presidential nominee in 1880.

Never enjoying robust health, Seymour suffered a permanent decline beginning in 1876. He made a final political effort in 1884 by campaigning for Grover Cleveland's election as president, but deteriorated physically the following year. On July 4, 1885, he was elected to represent his maternal grandfather Gen. Jonathan Forman in the Society of the Cincinnati in the State of New Jersey. In January 1886 his wife Mary suffered an illness. Seymour's own health worsened further. Seymour died in February 1886 and was interred in Forest Hill Cemetery in Utica, New York; Mary died a month later and is buried next to him.

Legacy

There is a memorial to Seymour at the Cathedral of All Saints (Albany, New York).

Seymour, Wisconsin, was founded in 1868 and named after Horatio Seymour.

Seymour Avenue in the Bronx, New York, was named for him.

Electoral history

Gubernatorial elections

1868 Presidential election

Notes

See also
Seymour-Conkling family

References

Further reading
 Furniss, Jack. "To save the union “in behalf of conservative men”: Horatio Seymour and the democratic vision for war." in New Perspectives on the Union War (Fordham University Press, 2019) pp. 63-90.
 Harris, William C. Two Against Lincoln: Reverdy Johnson and Horatio Seymour, Champions of the Loyal Opposition (2017) excerpt
 
   online edition
 , a standard scholarly biography.
 Murdock, Eugene C. "Horatio Seymour and the 1863 draft." Civil War History 11.2 (1965): 117-141. excerpt
 , thin

Primary sources
 Seymour, Horatio. Public Record: Including Speeches, Messages, Proclamations, Official Correspondence, and Other Public Utterances of Horatio Seymour; from the Campaign of 1856 to the Present Time. (1868) online.

External links

 
Mr. Lincoln and New York: Horatio Seymour
First Edition 1862 Report on Horatio Seymour Winning New York Governor's Race.
Speeches of Hon. Horatio Seymour : at the conventions held at Albany, January 31, 1861 and September 10, 1862
 Political Graveyard

|-

|-

|-

|-

|-

1810 births
1886 deaths
American lawyers admitted to the practice of law by reading law
American Protestants
Democratic Party (United States) presidential nominees
Democratic Party governors of New York (state)
Governors of New York (state)
Mayors of Utica, New York
New York (state) lawyers
Norwich University alumni
People of New York (state) in the American Civil War
Speakers of the New York State Assembly
Democratic Party members of the New York State Assembly
Union (American Civil War) political leaders
Union (American Civil War) state governors
Candidates in the 1868 United States presidential election
Seymour family (U.S.)
19th-century American lawyers
19th-century American businesspeople
Burials at Forest Hill Cemetery (Utica, New York)